"My Angel" is the debut single by the pop/opera vocal quartet Romanz. The song was released on 28 December 2012,
it was released via Select Music Records.

Background
The song was recorded in 2011 with Nianell on their joint project together 'N Duisend Drome. It was released as the Afrikaans version My Engel. In 2012 the song was re-recorded in English and was released as their debut worldwide single.

Music video
The music video for the song was released on October 12, 2012. The music video includes cuts of all four members. The video has over thirteen thousand views on YouTube.

Charts

Weekly charts

References 

2012 debut singles
Romanz songs
2012 songs